The Fouga Zéphyr (company designation CM.175) was a 1950s French two-seat carrier-capable jet trainer for the French Navy. It was developed from the land-based CM.170 Magister. The Zéphyr was retired in 1994.

Design and development

The French Navy's Aéronavale adopted a derivative of the Fouga CM.170-1 Magister as a basic trainer for carrier operations. Originally designated CM-170M Esquif, the prototype first flew on 31 July 1956, and was redesignated as the CM.175 Zéphyr soon after.

The Zéphyr differed from the Magister in being equipped with an arrester hook and a modified structure and undercarriage strengthened for carrier operations.  The Zéphyr also included a nose-mounted light.  As it did not have ejection seats, the Zéphyr had new sliding canopy hoods which could be locked open during carrier launchings and landings. One six-round rocket pod could be mounted under each wing for weapons training.  Two guns could be fitted in the nose, but these were seldom carried. Thirty-two aircraft were delivered.

Operational history
The first production aircraft first flew on 30 May 1959 and entered service in October 1959 with 59S the deck landing school at Hyéres. The squadron used only 14 aircraft at a time with the others being kept in short-term storage and periodically rotated to even out the flying hours. In 1962 the unit formed an aerobatic team using the Zéphyr called the Patrouille de Voltige d'Hyéres.

Variants
 CM-170M Esquif - prototype; 2 built.
 CM.175 Zéphyr - production version; 30 built.

Operators

 French Navy
59 Escadrille de Servitude

Specifications (CM.175)

See also

References

Further reading

 Kopenhagen, W., ed.  Das große Flugzeug-Typenbuch. Stuttgart, Germany: Transpress, 1987. .
 Jackson, Paul A, French Military Aviation Leicester, England: Midland Counties Publications, 1979. .

External links

 History of the Fouga Zéphyr

Zephyr
Fouga Magister
Twinjets
V-tail aircraft
Carrier-based aircraft
Mid-wing aircraft
Aircraft first flown in 1956